Old Jack's Boat is a British children's television series that stars Bernard Cribbins as Old Jack, the owner of a multi-coloured boat called The Rainbow. In each episode Jack (Cribbins) tells a story to his dog, Salty. Old Jack's Boat is also available on BBC iPlayer for over a year.

Production 
The series was filmed in Staithes in Yorkshire, and the scenery of the area is heavily featured in the episodes. Bernard Cribbins, in talking about the location, said “I’ve filmed in a lot of locations throughout my career, but there’s something about the sea air, the beauty and the friendliness in Staithes that makes it a special place to be.”

The first two series each had two stories written by Russell T Davies, with whom both Bernard Cribbins and Freema Agyeman had previously worked on Doctor Who. This was the first time Davies had ever written for a pre-school audience. On writing for pre-schoolers Davies said "It’s exciting new territory for me, writing for this age range. But this is the age when your imagination first starts! And when the call came from Bernard, asking me on board, I couldn't refuse - I'd do anything for that man!"

Reception 
Old Jack's Boat was positively received upon broadcast. Aislinn Kinsella, writing for Best British TV, said that the program was "suitably amusing for a CBeebies show" and that it was "sure to be a hit with the little ones and one or two older folks!" Glen Chapman, writing for website Den of Geek, said of the series: "Well, come on, it’s Bernard Cribbins telling stories? What more could you ask for? The man is a national treasure." The location filming was also praised, with Chapman saying that Staithes "looks every bit the idyllic location".

Cast 
 Jack: Bernard Cribbins
 Shelly Periwinkle: Freema Agyeman (series 1)
 Captain Periwinkle: Don Gilet (series 2)
 Ernie Starboard: Paul Hawkyard
 Miss Bowline-Hitch: Helen Lederer
 Emily Scuttlebutt: Janine Duvitski
 Sam Spinnaker: Nadine Marshall
 Salty the dog: Scuzz
 Young Jack: Sam Benjamin
 Sailor Sue: Carolina Main

Episodes

Episodes of the show usually consist of the theme tune, then a segment (usually a few minutes) featuring Old Jack, Salty the dog and a couple of the characters doing stuff around the village.

Jack and Salty then head to the Rainbow, where Jack usually has something to do (often something to mend), but puts it off to tell the story.

After the story, there is another segment featuring Jack and the characters from earlier to find out if that character was successful in whatever they were meant to accomplish.

Then the instrumental version of the theme tune plays, and Jack and Salty walk off into the distance.

Spin-off
A spin-off titled Old Jack's Boat: Rockpool Tales is about adventures of sea creatures, and another, Salty's Waggy Tales, is about the adventures of Salty the Dog. Old Jack's Boat: Rockpool Tales is also available on BBC iPlayer for over a year.

References

External links

2013 British television series debuts
2015 British television series endings
2010s British children's television series
BBC high definition shows
BBC children's television shows
British preschool education television series
English-language television shows
Television shows set in Yorkshire
CBeebies
Television series by BBC Studios